Vivian Pham is an Australian author. In 2021 she won two awards for her work.

Her first book, The Coconut Children, published in 2020 by Vintage Australia, an imprint of Penguin Books is set in 1990s Cabramatta. The novel won her recognition as one of The Sydney Morning Herald Best Young Australian Novelists as well as the Matt Richell Award for New Writer of the Year at the Australian Book Industry Awards. It was also shortlisted for both the Victorian Premier's Prize for Fiction and the Voss Literary Prize in 2021.

References

External links 

 

Living people
Year of birth missing (living people)
Place of birth missing (living people)
21st-century Australian novelists
Australian women novelists